Julio Ferrer (23 May 1953 – 4 January 2022) was a Puerto Rican sprinter. He competed in the men's 4 × 400 metres relay at the 1976 Summer Olympics. Ferrer died on 4 January 2022, at the age of 68.

References

External links
 

1953 births
2022 deaths
Athletes (track and field) at the 1972 Summer Olympics
Athletes (track and field) at the 1976 Summer Olympics
People from Carolina, Puerto Rico
Puerto Rican male sprinters
Puerto Rican male hurdlers
Olympic track and field athletes of Puerto Rico
Athletes (track and field) at the 1979 Pan American Games
Athletes (track and field) at the 1983 Pan American Games
Pan American Games competitors for Puerto Rico
Place of birth missing
Central American and Caribbean Games medalists in athletics